Wacana Bhakti Seminary for diocesan clergy was opened in 1988 on the campus of Gonzaga College, Jakarta, Indonesia, and is administered by the Society of Jesus.

See also

 List of Jesuit universities and colleges
 Catholic Church in Indonesia

References

External links 
 

Jesuit universities and colleges in Indonesia
Seminaries and theological colleges in Indonesia
Educational institutions established in 1988
1988 establishments in Indonesia
Education in Jakarta